{{Infobox person
| name               = Jiya
| image              = 
| image_size         = 
| caption            = 
| birth_date         = 
| birth_place        = Mumbai, Maharashtra
| education          = 
| years active       = 2013–present
| nationality        = Indian
| occupation         = 
| known_for          = {{ubl|Ved|Meri Hanikarak Biwi|Kaatelal & Sons}}
}} 

 Jiya Shankar  is an Indian television actress known for playing Dr. Iravati "Ira" Pandey in Meri Hanikarak Biwi and Susheela Ruhail Solanki "Susheela" in Kaatelal & Sons. Also appeared as a co host of "Good Night India" on SAB TV. She recently appeared in the Marathi movie Ved, starring alongside Ritesh Deshmukh, and Genelia Deshmukh.

 Career 
Shankar made her acting debut in 2013, in Telugu film named Entha Andanga Unnave starring alongside Ajay Manthena. Later in 2017, she appeared in a Tamil film named Kanavu Variyam opposite Arun Chidambaram. Shankar made her television debut, in 2015, as Alisha Rai with Bindass's Love by Chance opposite Karan Singhmar. Shankar made her first television outbreak, in 2016, by playing one of the leads Shreya Dixit Rathore in & TV's Queens Hain Hum.

Shankar was recently playing the role of Susheela Ruhail Solanki opposite Paras Arora in Sab TV's Kaatelal & Sons''..Since August 2022, she is playing the role of Pavitra opposite Harsh Rajput in Colors TV show Pishachini

She was recently seen starring as Nisha Katkar in Ved alongside Ritesh Deshmukh and Genelia Deshmukh. As of January 2023, the romantic thriller drama movie had had collected  at the box office. She received recognition for her moving acting skills, and being a fresh face in the Marathi film industry.

Filmography

Films

Television

Web series

See also 

 List of Hindi television actresses
 List of Indian television actresses

References

External links 

 

Living people
Indian television actresses
Actresses in Hindi television
Indian soap opera actresses
21st-century Indian actresses
People from Mumbai
Actors from Mumbai
1995 births